Raagangal Maaruvathillai is a 1983 Indian Tamil-language film directed by Sirumugai Ravi. The film stars Prabhu and Ambika. It was released on 23 September 1983.

Plot

Cast 
 Prabhu
 Ambika

Soundtrack 
The soundtrack was composed by Ilaiyaraaja. The song "Vizhigal Meeno" is set in Kalyani raga.

Reception 
Kalki appreciated the music, but criticised the story.

References

External links 
 

1980s Tamil-language films
Films scored by Ilaiyaraaja